Hajah Norsiah binti Haji Abdul Gapar (Seria, 24 April 1952) is a Bruneian writer. She graduated with a master's degree in Clinical Chemistry from London University in 1997. She was a recipient of the S.E.A. Write Award 2009.

Works
Hidup Ibarat Sungai, Dewan Bahasa dan Pustaka, (DBP), 1972
Bunga Rampai Sastera Melayu Brunei,  1984
Puncak Bicara, 1985
Pengabdian,  1987
The Islamic Interpretation of ‘Tragic Hero’ in Shakespearean Tragedies, IIUM Press, 2001
Colonial to Global: Malaysian Women’s Writing in English, 1940s-1990s, IIUM Press, 2001
In the Art of Naming: A Muslim Woman’s Journey, 2006
Janji kepada Inah , DBP:Brunei, 2007
Tsunami di Hatinya, 2009.

References

External links
SEAWRITE:COM

1952 births
Living people
Bruneian writers
Alumni of the University of London
Bruneian women writers